The 1994 Junior League World Series took place from August 15–20 in Taylor, Michigan, United States. Thousand Oaks, California defeated Hamilton, Ohio in the championship game.

Teams

Results

References

Junior League World Series
Junior League World Series
Junior